George Manuel, OC (February 21, 1921 – November 15, 1989, Secwépemc) was an Aboriginal leader in Canada. Born and raised in British Columbia, he became politically active there and in Alberta. In 1970 he was elected and served until 1976 as chief of the National Indian Brotherhood (known today as the Assembly of First Nations). In 1975 he founded and became president of the World Council of Indigenous Peoples, serving until 1981. 

Reflecting on his work with indigenous peoples across the Americas, he wrote The Fourth World: An Indian Reality (1975), exploring the effects of waves of European immigration on these peoples. In his later years, he served as president of the Union of BC Indian Chiefs, 1979 through 1981.

Biography
Manuel was born to Maria and Rainbow in 1921, on the Secwepemc territory of the Shuswap people in British Columbia. Maria later married Louie Manuel, and George took his stepfather's last name. He was first educated at the Kamloops Indian Residential School. 

After contracting tuberculosis (which had no effective antibiotic treatment at the time), he was transferred to an Indian TB hospital on an Indian reservation near Chilliwack, British Columbia. There Manuel met Marceline Paul (Kootenai) from St. Mary's Indian Band. They later married and had six children together.

Political career
Manuel became involved in indigenous politics and his increasing responsibilities strained his marriage. He was elected chief of the Neskonlith Indian Band. In 1959, following the death of his mentor Andy Paull, Manuel was elected head of the North American Indian Brotherhood. Soon after, he and Marceline separated. 

Not long after this, the federal Department of Indian Affairs hired Manuel for a position with the Cowichan Tribes government at Duncan. Manuel worked as a Community Development Officer. In addition to assisting the tribe, he also worked to increase wider awareness in the government and society of the problems and conditions faced by the Cowichan people.

Manuel next worked for the Alberta Brotherhood, which represented indigenous peoples in the province. There he developed a strong working relationship with political leader Harold Cardinal (Cree). In this position, Manuel met and worked extensively with chiefs across Canada, becoming familiar with a wide range of issues. 

Cardinal encouraged Manuel to run for national chief of the newly created National Indian Brotherhood, a body that would represent almost 250,000 'status Indians' in Canada. Manuel served as its first national chief from 1970 to 1976. (In the early 1980s the National Indian Brotherhood changed its system of representation, relying on chiefs of First Nations rather than representatives from regional organizations, and developing a more direct relationship with the Nations. To reflect this, it renamed itself in 1982 as the Assembly of First Nations.)

In 1975 Manuel helped found and was elected as the president of the World Council of Indigenous Peoples, serving in this position until 1981. In this role he travelled internationally, meeting with and advocating for the indigenous people of nations of South America, such as Argentina, Chile, and Peru. 

He had begun to think deeply about the effects of successive waves of European expansion on Indigenous societies in the Americas, and considered these native peoples together as "the Fourth World." They had numerous experiences in common in terms of having to adapt to colonisation and its aftermath. Manuel wrote a book, The Fourth World: An Indian Reality, expanding on this idea, co-written with Michael Posluns; it was published in 1975.

George Manuel was President of the Union of BC Indian Chiefs (UBCIC) from 1979 to 1981, where he continued to inspire indigenous  action. He developed the Aboriginal Rights Position Paper and organized what came to be regarded as one of the UBCIC's most ambitious projects: the Indian Constitutional Express. Under his leadership, the UBCIC gained esteem both from the indigenous people for whom it was created, and gained stature from the general public.

Legacy and honours
 He was made an Officer of the Order of Canada
 He was repeatedly recognized for his international work by the World Council of Indigenous Peoples. 
 In 1983 he received an honorary degree from the University of British Columbia, Vancouver. 
 In 1984, Manuel and Dr. Rudolph C. Ryser formed the Center for World Indigenous Studies.

His sons Robert and Arthur Manuel (enrolled Secwepemc like their father) also became active in indigenous politics.

His eldest daughter Vera Manuel (1948-2010) became an internationally known playwright, and poet as well as a highly respected leader in the community.

His younger daughter Doreen Manuel is a film maker.

References

Further reading
 McFarlane, Peter, "Brotherhood to Nationhood: George Manuel and the Making of the Modern Indian Movement," (Toronto : Between the Lines, 1993),

External links
 The George Manuel Institute
 Michael Posluns fonds, Clara Thomas Archives & Special Collections, York University Libraries. (includes correspondence, recordings and other material related to Manuel's collaboration with Michael Posluns on The Fourth World.)

1921 births
1989 deaths
20th-century First Nations people
Assembly of First Nations chiefs
Indigenous leaders in British Columbia
Officers of the Order of Canada
Secwepemc people